The Larklight trilogy is a trilogy of young adult novels by Philip Reeve, entitled Larklight, Starcross, and Mothstorm. These books are all illustrated by David Wyatt.

Setting
The Larklight trilogy is set in an alternative Victorian-era universe, where mankind has been exploring the solar system for at least a century. Earth is the same as it was in the late 19th century, but only the United Kingdom and its Empire possess the engines to travel across the solar system. The United States, which the British consider to be rebellious colonies, and France, though not technically at war with Britain on Earth, are in a struggle to sabotage the Britons' expansive interests and develop space technology of their own.
London, the centre of the universe, has many spaceports and is the base of many organisations such as the Royal Xenological Society.

Larklight 

Larklight is the first book in the series. The story begins in the Larklight manor where they have a visitor. However, soon, white spiders from Saturn invade Larklight and they have to save the known universe from a madman.

Starcross 

Starcross, the second book in the trilogy begins when Art Mumby and his prim older sister Myrtle, at their home (Larklight) with their mother and father, receive a strange invitation to the Starcross hotel, located in the asteroid field.

Mothstorm 

Mothstorm, the third book and the last book in the trilogy, was published in hardback in October 2008. The paperback was scheduled to be published on 6 July 2009. They fight giant moths, and a race of blue lizards led by a Rogue Shaper.

Film adaptations
Warner Bros. had planned a $200 million adaptation of the first book Larklight, with Shekhar Kapur directing. The movie would have been released in 2010. It is unknown if the rest of the trilogy will be adapted. However Shekhar Kapur said Larklight will be the last expensive movie he will make, so it is unlikely that Starcross and Mothstorm will be adapted unless another director chooses to do so.

The film was planned to be released January 1, 2010, but after the death of director Anthony Minghella, Shekhar Kapur took over his unfinished movie, New York, I Love You, and Larklight had to be postponed.

References

External links
 
 Review at Kidsreads.com

 
Book series introduced in 2006
Novels by Philip Reeve
Novel series
Alternate history novels
Fantasy books by series
Steampunk novels
Fantasy novel trilogies
Science fiction novel trilogies